Ariél Stanley Pakes (born 1949) is the Thomas Professor of Economics at Harvard University. He specializes in econometrics and industrial organization.

He is a fellow of the Econometric Society and the American Academy of Arts and Sciences, a winner of the Frisch Medal, and a recipient of the BBVA Foundation Frontiers of Knowledge Award. He was elected to the National Academy of Sciences in 2017. Ariel was the Distinguished Fellow of the Industrial Organization in 2007. In 2017 he received the Jean-Jacques Laffont Prize and in 2018 the BBVA Frontiers of Knowledge Award. In 2019 Ariel was appointed a distinguished fellow of the American Economic Association.

Ariel's research has focused on developing methods for empirically analyzing market responses to environmental and policy changes. This includes developing: i) demand systems that are capable of analyzing the impact of environmental changes (e.g. mergers) on prices, ii) methods capable of analyzing the impact of policy changes (e.g. deregulation) on productivity, and iii) models capable of following the impacts of these changes on the evolution of markets over time. He and his co-authors have applied these tools to the analysis of the auto, electricity, health care, and telecommunications equipment industries. Ariel also developed techniques for: analyzing the impacts of privately funded research and development activity, for constructing a more accurate Consumer Price Index, and for analyzing the impact of incentive schemes on the hospital allocations of doctors.

Many of Ariel's methodological contributions have been incorporated into the work of government agencies and private firms. Ariel has mentored over sixty doctoral students, many of whom are now leading researchers at prestigious universities. Additionally, he has done work for a number of consultancies, government agencies, and large firms.

He is most famous for the Berry Levinsohn Pakes (BLP) approach to demand estimation and the Olley and Pakes approach to estimation of production functions.

He received his B.A. and M.A. from the Hebrew University of Jerusalem in 1971 and 1973 and an M.A. and PhD from Harvard in 1976 and 1979.

References

External links 
 Professor Pakes's webpage at Harvard
 BLP on JSTOR
 Olley and Pakes on JSTOR

1949 births
Living people
Academic staff of the Hebrew University of Jerusalem
University of Wisconsin–Madison faculty
Yale University faculty
Harvard University faculty
Fellows of the Econometric Society
Canadian economists
Econometricians
Microeconometricians
Place of birth missing (living people)
Hebrew University of Jerusalem alumni
Harvard University alumni
20th-century American economists
21st-century American economists
Fellows of the American Academy of Arts and Sciences
Members of the United States National Academy of Sciences
Date of birth missing (living people)